Sir Edmund Kerchever Chambers,  (16 March 1866 – 21 January 1954), usually known as E. K. Chambers, was an English literary critic and Shakespearean scholar. His four-volume work on The Elizabethan Stage, published in 1923, remains a standard resource.

Life
Chambers was born in West Ilsley, Berkshire. His father was a curate there and his mother the daughter of a Victorian theologian. He was educated at Marlborough College, before matriculating at Corpus Christi College, Oxford. He won a number of prizes, including the chancellor's prize in English for an essay on literary forgery in 1891. He took a job with the national education department, and married Eleanor Bowman in 1893.

In the newly created Board of Education, Chambers worked principally to oversee adult and continuing education. He rose to be second secretary, but the work for which he is remembered took place outside the office, at least before he retired from the Board in 1926. He was the first president of the Malone Society, serving from 1906 to 1939. He edited collections of verse for Oxford University Press. He produced a work on King Arthur and a privately printed collection of poems.

However, Chambers's great work, begun even before he left Oxford and pursued for three decades, was an extensive examination of the history and conditions of English theatre in the medieval and Renaissance periods. It was published in three bursts. The Medieval Stage, issued in 1903, offered a comprehensive survey of medieval theatre, covering not only the fairly well-known interludes, but also the then-obscure folk drama, minstrelsy, and liturgical drama. The Elizabethan Stage followed after two decades. The work, though it contained less original discovery than its predecessor, was often referenced to describe the material conditions of English Renaissance theatre. It is no longer considered reliable, since Chambers misrepresents the royal household as an organizational entity in general, and the duties of the Master of Revels, in particular. In 1930 came at last the two-volume work on Shakespeare, which collected and analysed the extant evidence of Shakespeare's work and life. Current scholarship does not consider the relationship between "liturgical drama" and stage performance to have been as strong as Chambers claims.

In his retirement, Chambers produced works on Coleridge (1938) and Matthew Arnold (1947). After moving to Eynsham, Oxfordshire, he returned to medieval history, producing a volume in the Oxford history and a local study of Eynsham. He died on 21 January 1954 at Beer, Devon, at the age of 87.

Chambers was invested as a Companion of the Order of the Bath in 1912, KBE in 1925. In 1924, he was elected fellow of the British Academy and his biography Samuel Taylor Coleridge was awarded the 1938 James Tait Black Memorial Prize.

He was a member of the Athenæum.

Works
The History and Motives of Literary Forgeries (1891)
Poems of John Donne (1896, editor)
The Tragedy of Coriolanus (1898, editor)
The Mediaeval Stage (2 volumes, 1903); Vol. I Vol. II
Early English Lyrics (1907, editor)
Carmina Argentea (1918, poems)
The Elizabethan Stage (4 volumes, 1923); Vol. I Vol. II Vol. III Vol. IV
Shakespeare: A Survey (1925)
Arthur of Britain (1927)
William Shakespeare: A Study of Facts and Problems (2 volumes; 1930)
Vol. I
The Oxford Book of Sixteenth Century Verse (1932, editor)
The English Folk-play (1933)
Sir Henry Lee (1936)
Eynsham Under the Monks (1936)
Sir Thomas Wyatt and Some Collected Studies (1937)
Samuel Taylor Coleridge: a biographical study (1938)
Shakespearean Gleanings (1941)
English Literature at the Close of the Middle Ages (1945)
Matthew Arnold (1947).

References

Further reading
Wilson, John Dover. "Obituary of Sir Edmund Kerchever Chambers 1866–1954." Proceedings of the British Academy 42 (1956).

External links

1866 births
1954 deaths
People from West Berkshire District
People educated at Marlborough College
Alumni of Corpus Christi College, Oxford
Historians of theatre
Shakespearean scholars
Companions of the Order of the Bath
People from Eynsham
Knights Commander of the Order of the British Empire
James Tait Black Memorial Prize recipients
Arthurian scholars
Fellows of the British Academy
Corresponding Fellows of the Medieval Academy of America
British literary critics